Luis Cid Pérez, known as Carriega (9 December 1929 – 13 February 2018) was a Spanish professional football coach and player. He managed a number of club sides including Sporting de Gijón, Real Zaragoza, Sevilla, Real Betis, Atlético Madrid and UE Figueres.

References

External links
 
 

1929 births
2018 deaths
People from Allariz – Maceda
Sportspeople from the Province of Ourense
Spanish footballers
Association football forwards
UD Orensana players
Racing de Ferrol footballers
Real Oviedo players
Burgos CF footballers
Spanish football managers
Sevilla FC managers
Real Zaragoza managers
Real Betis managers
Atlético Madrid managers
Elche CF managers
UP Langreo managers